Matthias Kühne (born 27 September 1987) is a German footballer who plays as a defender who plays for Einheit Rudolstadt in the NOFV-Oberliga Süd.

Career
Kühne moved to Carl Zeiss Jena for the 2016–17 season.

References

External links

Living people
1987 births
People from Wurzen
Association football defenders
German footballers
FC Sachsen Leipzig players
MSV Duisburg players
SV Babelsberg 03 players
SV Elversberg players
FC Carl Zeiss Jena players
3. Liga players
Regionalliga players
Footballers from Saxony